VNDroid: Vietnamese Mobile Development Community is a Vietnamese-based mobile development community portal where mobile platform developers can share knowledge. The portal launched in December 2009.

Background
VNdroid was visualized when the team sought a Vietnamese-based community to do research on the Google Android platform. There are very few portals for Vietnamese developers to share knowledge, especially for new technology, such as Windows Mobile and Android. A team of developers, project managers and business analysts from FPT Software, an outsourcing software company in Vietnam, decided to create a portal where developers, both inside and outside of the company, can seek knowledge, and exchange experiences.

Developers 
VNdroid.com was founded and initially used by a group of developers, project managers, technical and business analysts come from domains including Docjax team from Docjax.com, a document search website, Skydoor, and FPT Software.

References

External links 
 VNdroid.com
 VNdroid.net

Internet properties established in 2009
Free-content websites
Community websites
Online companies of Vietnam
Internet in Vietnam